Anontsibe  Centre or Anontsibe Sakalava is a town and commune in Madagascar. It belongs to the district of Manja, which is a part of Menabe Region. The population of the commune was estimated to be approximately 10,000 in 2001 commune census.

Only primary schooling is available. The majority 99% of the population of the commune are farmers, while an additional 1% receives their livelihood from raising livestock. The most important crops are rice and onions, while other important agricultural products are maize and lima beans.

References and notes 

Populated places in Menabe